Piruna haferniki, the chisos skipperling, is a species of intermediate skipper in the butterfly family Hesperiidae. It is found in Central America and North America.

The MONA or Hodges number for Piruna haferniki is 3986.

References

Further reading

 

Heteropterinae
Articles created by Qbugbot